In number theory, a Dudeney number in a given number base  is a natural number equal to the perfect cube of another natural number such that the digit sum of the first natural number is equal to the second.  The name derives from Henry Dudeney, who noted the existence of these numbers in one of his puzzles, Root Extraction, where a professor in retirement at Colney Hatch postulates this as a general method for root extraction.

Mathematical definition 
Let  be a natural number. We define the Dudeney function for base  and power   to be the following:

where  is the  times the number of digits in the number in base . 

Sociable Dudeney numbers and amicable Dudeney numbers are the powers of their respective roots. 

It can be shown that given a number base  and power , the maximum Dudeney root has to satisfy this bound:

 

implying a finite number of Dudeney roots and Dudeney numbers for each order  and base .

 is the digit sum. The only Dudeney numbers are the single-digit numbers in base , and there are no periodic points with prime period greater than 1.

Dudeney numbers, roots, and cycles of Fp,b for specific p and b  
All numbers are represented in base .

Extension to negative integers
Dudeney numbers can be extended to the negative integers by use of a signed-digit representation to represent each integer.

Programming example
The example below implements the Dudeney function described in the definition above to search for Dudeney roots, numbers and cycles in Python.
def dudeneyf(x: int, p: int, b: int) -> int:
    """Dudeney function."""
    y = pow(x, p)
    total = 0
    while y > 0:
        total = total + y % b
        y = y // b
    return total

def dudeneyf_cycle(x: int, p: int, b: int) -> List:
    seen = []
    while x not in seen:
        seen.append(x)
        x = dudeneyf(x, p, b)
    cycle = []
    while x not in cycle:
        cycle.append(x)
        x = dudeneyf(x, p, b)
    return cycle

See also
 Arithmetic dynamics
 Factorion
 Happy number
 Kaprekar's constant
 Kaprekar number
 Meertens number
 Narcissistic number
 Perfect digit-to-digit invariant
 Perfect digital invariant
 Sum-product number

References 

H. E. Dudeney, 536 Puzzles & Curious Problems, Souvenir Press, London, 1968, p 36, #120.

External links
 Generalized Dudeney Numbers
 Proving There are Only Six Dudeney Numbers 

Arithmetic dynamics
Base-dependent integer sequences